Graveyard Keeper's Daughter is a 2011 Estonian drama film written and directed by Katrin Laur.

Cast
 Maria Avdjuško as Maria
 Epp Eespäev as Tuvike
 Kertu-Killu Grenman as Lucia
 Ülle Kaljuste as Anne
 Eva Klemets as Õp. Mets
 Kersti Kreismann as Õp. Purga
 Arvo Kukumägi as Joss
 Esther Kõiv as Jats
 Ulla Reinikainen as Sirpa
 Rain Simmul as Kaido
 Katrin Järv as Saara
 Andres Tabun as Robert 
 Terje Pennie as Poe-Livii
 Karin Tammaru as Direktor Jaaksoo
 Carolina Kuris as Jasmin
 Kristel Leesmend as Ilse
 Tarvo Poldomaa as	Anto
 Priit Sepp as Sverre
 Haide Männamäe as	Haide Männamäe
 Märt Visnapuu as Pats
 Mait Lepik as Shelter guard
 Andres Raag

References

External links
 

2011 films
2011 drama films
Estonian-language films
Estonian drama films